Vivien Elisabeth Cardone (born April 14, 1993) is an American actress, known for her role as Doctor Brown's daughter Delia on The WB's Everwood from 2002 to 2006. She has appeared in One Life to Live (2011), Theater, Interrupted (2020-2021).

Early life
Cardone was born in Port Jefferson Village, Long Island, New York. Her father, Mark, is a Long Island residential home builder and her mother is a homemaker. Vivien is the second oldest of four children. Her older sister Olivia is also an actress. She has a younger brother named Dallas and a younger sister named Lydia. Vivien was named after Vivien Leigh, her mother's favorite actress. the Cardone children were homeschooled, Vivien entered school in 2005.

Career
Cardone began her professional acting career at the age of three months in national campaign commercials, for such companies as Pizza Hut, Sears, Pillsbury, Sherwin-Williams, and Prudential.New York. Her first film performance was as Marcee Herman in the Academy Award winning film A Beautiful Mind. Her biggest role so far has been in Everwood, in which she played Delia Brown. She played the role for four seasons, until the show was cancelled in May 2006. She was nominated for a Young Artist Award for Best Supporting Young Actress in a TV series for all four seasons.
 
In 2008, Cardone starred in the film All Roads Lead Home. In it she plays Belle, a 12-year-old girl who has to cope with the loss of her mother from an automobile accident. It stars Peter Coyote, Jason London and Peter Boyle in his last film. She appeared in an episode of Law & Order: Criminal Intent in 2010. In 2011, Cardone starred as Michelle in eight episodes of One Life to Live

Filmography

Film

Television

References

External links
 
 Vivien Cardone's biography on filmbug
 Official website

1993 births
Living people
20th-century American actresses
21st-century American actresses
Actresses from New York (state)
American child actresses
American film actresses
American soap opera actresses
American television actresses
People from Port Jefferson, New York